Isabella Velicogna is a geoscientist known for her work using gravity measurements from space to study changes in the polar ice sheets and water storage on Earth.

Education and career 
Velicogna has a B.S. and M.S. in physics (1995) and a Ph.D. (1999) from the University of Trieste, Italy. Following her Ph.D. she moved to the University of Colorado, Boulder where she worked from 1999 until 2007. Velicogna started an appointment at the National Aeronautics and Space Administration's Jet Propulsion Laboratory in 2006. At the same time, she joined the faculty at the University of California, Irvine where she was appointed professor in 2016.

Velicogna was one of the contributing authors to "Observations: Cryosphere" in the 2013 report from the Intergovernmental Panel on Climate Change. In 2020, she was elected a fellow of the American Geophysical Union who cited her "for groundbreaking research to document and explain the evolution of ice sheets and groundwater resources using gravity remote sensing technologies."

Research 
Velicogna developed the use of time series analysis of gravity data from the Gravity Recovery and Climate Experiment (GRACE) satellite to track changes in polar ice sheets and in 2006 she used this metric to quantify the loss of ice in Antarctic. By 2009, her data revealed the rate of ice loss is increasing in both Greenland and Antarctica with large losses of ice in Greenland during the 2019 season. Velicogna and her colleagues use data from the GRACE satellite to track sea level rise which allows global estimates of changes in sea level. Velicogna has also applied time series of gravity data to changes in groundwater storage in different geographic locales including India, Texas, and the Canadian Arctic.

Selected publications

Awards and honors 
Kavli fellow, National Academy of Sciences (2008, 2014, 2015)
Vening Meinesz Medal for distinguished research in geodesy, European Geosciences Union (2017)
Fellow, American Geophysical Union (2020)
Joanne Simpson Medal for mid-career scientists, American Geophysical Union (2020)

References

External links 
 

Fellows of the American Geophysical Union
University of Trieste alumni
University of California, Irvine faculty
NASA people
Living people
Italian climatologists
Women hydrologists
Year of birth missing (living people)